Alsophila leichhardtiana, synonym Cyathea leichhardtiana, the prickly tree fern, is a plant in the tree fern family, Cyatheaceae, found in eastern Australia (Victoria, New South Wales and Queensland). It is a common species found in moist situations, in and near rainforests. It was named in honour of the explorer and botanical collector Ludwig Leichhardt.

Seen between one and seven metres tall, it may be identified by the thin, prickly trunk, 5 to 15 cm wide. The sori lack true indusia, the base of the sorus bears a ring of scales. Fronds are up to 3 metres long, and the stipe is around 20 cm in length.

Taxonomy
It was first described in 1865 by Ferdinand von Mueller as Alsophila leichhardtiana from several specimens, one of which was collected by Ludwig Leichhardt in Moreton Bay, and another by Louisa Atkinson in the Blue Mountains. It was named and described many times. In 1912, Edwin Copeland transferred the species to Cyathea as Cyathea leichhardtiana. It has since been restored to Alsophila.

References

External links
 Cyathea leichhardtiana: Occurrence data from The Australasian Virtual Herbarium
 Cyathea leichhardtiana: Images from Flickr

leichhardtiana
Flora of New South Wales
Flora of Queensland
Flora of Victoria (Australia)
Plants described in 1865
Taxa named by Ferdinand von Mueller